"Christmas in Hollis" is a single by Run-DMC that was included on two 1987 Christmas compilation albums featuring various artists: A Very Special Christmas (A&M 3911) and Christmas Rap (Profile 1247). When Bill Adler first asked Run-DMC to contribute to A Very Special Christmas—the first in a series of various artists compilation albums produced to benefit the Special Olympics—they refused. After Bill—who was then the director of publicity for Rush Productions, which managed Run-DMC—gave the band the idea for "Christmas in Hollis," they changed their minds and agreed to be on the album. (Other contributing artists included Whitney Houston, Sting, Bruce Springsteen and the E Street Band, Madonna, and Bob Seger.)  The track was produced by the group along with Rick Rubin and was originally released as a single in 1987 by A&M. In 2000, thirteen years after it was first released, it reached number 78 on the Billboard Hot R&B/Hip-Hop Songs chart.

The title refers to Hollis, Queens, the New York City neighborhood in which the members of Run-DMC grew up. The track samples Clarence Carter's 1968 holiday song "Back Door Santa", as well as "Frosty the Snowman", "Jingle Bells", and "Joy to the World" and features an Acme siren.

"Christmas in Hollis" was included as a bonus track on the deluxe edition of Tougher Than Leather.

Music video
The music video for "Christmas in Hollis" takes place at the North Pole and in Hollis, Queens. At the end of the video, Santa is seen flying away with his sled being pulled by a dog. The video was directed by Michael Holman with cinematography by Mark Richardson, both NYU film students at the time, and features a cameo appearance by Bannah McDaniels, DMC's adoptive mother. "Christmas in Hollis" went on to win Rolling Stones Best Video of the Year award in 1987, beating out Michael Jackson's "Bad" directed by Martin Scorsese.

In popular culture
 The song was used in the movies Less than Zero (1987), Die Hard (1988), The Night Before (2015), The Grinch (2018), and Holiday Rush (2019).
 Run-DMC performed the song live in the 1987 A Very Special Christmas CBS TV special, and on the Christmas episode of All That.
 It was also used in the TV shows The Office, Everybody Hates Chris, Chuck, Brooklyn Nine-Nine, Lip Sync Battle, Orange Is the New Black, Hindsight, The Simpsons, How to Be Single, and Hawkeye.
 The song was sampled on a track called "Ballin' on Christmas," featuring Jim Jones, J.R. Writer, & Stack Bundles, and released as part of Jones' album "A Dipset X-Mas" in 2006.
 Kid Cholesterol produced a re-edited version of the song entitled "Christmas at Holly’s" in 2010.
 The story of the making of the song was told at length by Joseph "Run" Simmons and Bill Adler in Mitchell Kezin's documentary film, "Jingle Bell Rocks" (2013).
 The song was used as part of UK catalogue retailers Argos Christmas 2014 campaign.
 The song was used in the 2015 and 2018 Christmas ads for the Nissan automobile lineup.
 Eve covered this song on The Talk during the shows holiday special in 2019. During the performance her fellow co-hosts Carrie Ann Inaba performed a dance break and Sheryl Underwood paid homage to Jam Master Jay as Eve's DJ.

Track listing

A-side
"Christmas in Hollis"
"Walk This Way"

B-side
"Peter Piper"
"King of Rock"

Charts

References

External links
 Run-DMC - Christmas in Hollis

1987 singles
American Christmas songs
Christmas novelty songs
Run-DMC songs
Songs written by Darryl McDaniels
Songs written by Joseph Simmons
Songs written by Jam Master Jay
1987 songs
A&M Records singles
Song recordings produced by Rick Rubin
Songs about New York City
Singles with cover art by Keith Haring